Havre High School is a high school (grades 912) in the small town of Havre, Hill County, Montana. It is within the Havre Public Schools. The school colors are blue and white and the mascot is the Blue Ponies.

Notable alumni
 Jacob Bachmeier, state representative
 Ryan Divish, Seattle Times baseball writer
 Marc Mariani, NFL football player
 Jill McLain, beauty queen
 Flint Rasmussen, rodeo clown

See also 
 List of high schools in Montana

External links
 

Schools in Hill County, Montana
Public high schools in Montana